This is a list of Punjabi films scheduled to be released or released in 2021.

Box office

Released

See also
 List of Punjabi films of 2020
 List of Punjabi films
 List of highest-grossing Punjabi films

References

External links
  New Punjabi films
 Upcoming Punjabi films

2021
Films
Punjabi